Saint John Shipbuilding was a Canadian shipbuilding company located in Saint John, New Brunswick. The shipyard was active from 1923 to 2003.

History
Numerous shipyards were located on the shores of Courtney Bay in the east end of Saint John Harbour where extensive mud flats dried at low tide.

In 1918 it was announced that the St. John Drydock & Shipbuilding Co. would be established as a subsidiary of the Canada Dredging Co., Ltd. of Midland, Ontario and would construct the largest drydock in the world.

The new shipyard with its massive drydock opened in 1923 at a location on the eastern shore of Courtney Bay. The first of its long list of vessels, the ferry MV Kipawo, which still exists, was launched on December 5, 1924. After fit-up, it went into service in 1926.

The shipyard was sold in the 1950s to the industrialist K.C. Irving. The ensuing corporate restructuring saw the company renamed Saint John Shipbuilding & Dry Dock Co., Ltd.. By the 1980s, it came to be known simply as Saint John Shipbuilding and was the flagship of a collection of eastern Canadian shipyards operated by Irving Shipbuilding.

The shipyard was used to construct oil tankers for Irving Oil and freighters and other cargo vessels for Kent Lines, a shipping company owned by K.C. Irving. The facility also received a contract from Canadian Pacific Railway in 1969 to build a passenger-vehicle ferry for its Bay of Fundy service from Saint John to Digby. Similarly, the government-owned ferry operator CN Marine placed an order in the early 1980s for a passenger-vehicle ferry for its Northumberland Strait service to Prince Edward Island.

Canadian Patrol Frigate Project

By far the largest contract placed with the shipyard, and the largest single shipbuilding order ever issued in Canadian history, was for the Royal Canadian Navy's  program, which saw nine warships built at Saint John during the early 1990s.  Flush with revenues during this contract, Irving Shipbuilding went on a buying spree of several bankrupt or failing shipyards in eastern Canada as part of a strategy to assist with spreading the work at its overcrowded shipyard in Saint John.

The East Isle Shipyard in Georgetown, Prince Edward Island was purchased from the provincial government and used to construct modules for the Halifax-class frigates. Similarly, Irving Shipbuilding purchased the Shelburne Ship Repair shipyard in Shelburne and the Pictou Shipyard in Pictou to support the Halifax-class project.

However, changing global economic conditions for Canada's shipbuilders during the late 1990s coupled with changes to federal government tariffs and tax policies for Canadian ship owners saw Saint John Shipbuilding left with little work after the Halifax-class frigates were completed.  Kent Lines ordered several container ships and Irving Shipbuilding's shipyards in Nova Scotia and Prince Edward Island were kept moderately busy with repair and small contract construction, but there were no large contracts on the horizon. The skilled workforce at Saint John Shipbuilding dwindled as welders and engineers and other trades and professionals left for work on other projects in Canada and abroad. The yard was mothballed in 2000 after it completed its last ship.

Finally on 27 June 2003, Irving Shipbuilding announced that it had signed an agreement with the federal government for $55 million in economic readjustment funding provided that Saint John Shipbuilding be closed permanently. The Irving Group of Companies announced the intention of permanently decommissioning Canada's largest shipyard and building a new wallboard manufacturing plant and other businesses on the site.

Ships built

Warships

  s:
 , launched in 1940
 , launched in 1941
 , launched in 1941
 s:
 , launched in 1988
 , launched in 1989
 , launched in 1991
 , launched in 1992
 , launched in 1994
 , launched in 1995
 , launched in 1995
 , launched in 1996
 , launched in 1996
  auxiliary vessels:
 , launched in 1968
 , launched in 1969

Research vessels

Ferries
For Canadian National Railways:
 
For CN Marine:
 , launched in 1982
For Canadian Pacific Railway:
 
 , launched in 1971
For Province of New Brunswick:
 MV Grand Manan, launched in 1965

Icebreakers
 MV Kigoriak (for Canadian Marine Drilling a subsidiary of Dome Petroleum)

Fishing trawlers
 Marc Guylaine, allegedly a "cursed" ship whose two sister ships sank

Saint John Shipbuilding services has been terminated and all work has been sent to the Halifax yards. The former dry dock cranes have been removed and the building is now Irving Wall board services. The train still can access the facility to remove shipments, but there is no and will not be in the foreseeable future.

References

External links
 Saint John to Have Biggest Drydock.
 Sad day for Saint John Shipbuilding

Shipbuilding companies of Canada
Former defence companies of Canada
Defunct companies of New Brunswick
1918 establishments in New Brunswick
Companies based in Saint John, New Brunswick
2003 disestablishments in New Brunswick
Defunct manufacturing companies of Canada